Justin Anderson (born 23 March 1967) is a British film director and screenwriter.

Biography
Anderson trained as a painter at the Slade School of Fine Art in London, where he won the John Ruskin Prize for painting. He then worked as an assistant for Scottish artist Bruce McLean before continuing his studies at the Rijksakademie van beeldende kunsten in Amsterdam, where he first began experimenting with video. Upon returning to London, he made several short films for Levi's, shooting on Super 8 and 16 mm film. He then briefly worked at HHCL, an advertising agency, until moving to a shared studio with fashion designer Flora McLean, for whom he made Dress No. 1 for SHOWstudio's Future Tense series that was covered by Diane Pernet. He also directed another video that was featured on Vogue Italia.

Anderson has directed short films and commercials in collaboration with fashion designers such as Roksanda Ilincic, Richard Nicoll and Jonathan Saunders, fashion houses such as Armani and Agent Provocateur, as well as companies such as Replay Jeans and Schweppes.

In December 2014, Anderson was awarded the option of the Booker-nominated novel Swimming Home by Deborah Levy. The film is currently in development and is set to be his first feature film as a director. In 2016, he shot a short film entitled The Idyll based on the short story Idylle by Guy de Maupassant. It features French actress Emma de Caunes and Scottish actor Dougray Scott.

Filmography

Awards

References

External links
 

1967 births
Living people
British film directors
British music video directors
Television commercial directors